The Endako station is on the Canadian National Railway mainline in Endako, British Columbia.  The station is served by Via Rail's Jasper – Prince Rupert train.

Footnotes

External links 
Via Rail Station Description

Via Rail stations in British Columbia